is a Ferris wheel in Kagoshima, Japan. The wheel sits on top of Amu Plaza Kagoshima adjoining Kagoshima-Chūō Station, and is one of the major attractions in the city. The wheel has a diameter of 60 m, and is 91 m from the ground at its highest point. It has 36 gondolas, of which two are completely transparent. The wheel takes approximately 14 minutes and 30 seconds to make a complete revolution.

History
 September 2004: Amuran opens.
 June 2005: Number of riders passes 500,000.
 May 2007: Number of riders passes 1 million.
Source:

References

External links
 Amu Plaza Kagoshima Official website 

Ferris wheels in Japan
Buildings and structures in Kagoshima
Amusement rides introduced in 2004
2004 establishments in Japan